Brian Charles Hall (born 2 March 1934) is a former English cricketer who played first-class cricket for Worcestershire, making a total of three appearances (none of them in the County Championship) in 1956 and 1957.

Hall played a few times for Middlesex's Second XI in 1954 and 1955,
but he never made a first-class appearance for the county. His debut came at the end of June 1956 when Worcestershire played Oxford University; he took all three of his first-class wickets in this game, dismissing Jimmy Allan twice, and made his highest score of 21 in the first innings.

In the two matches he played in 1957 — against Oxford University once again and Combined Services — he took no wickets and scored one run. Hall never played first-class cricket again.

Notes
Hall went on to take over 1720 wickets for Stanmore Cricket Club and captained the club 1966-1970.

References

English cricketers
Worcestershire cricketers
1934 births
Living people